Sigridea is a genus of lichenized fungi in the family Roccellaceae.

The genus was circumscribed by Anders Tehler in Cryptog. bot. vol.3 (2) on page 145 in 1993.

The genus name of Sigridea is in honour of Sigrid Tehler, who was the daughter of the author (of the genus), Anders Tehler.

Species
As accepted by Species Fungorum;
Sigridea albella 
Sigridea californica 
Sigridea chloroleuca 
Sigridea glaucomoides 
Sigridea labyrinthica 

Former species;
Sigridea leptothallus  = Roccellina leptothalla, Roccellaceae

References

Roccellaceae
Lichen genera
Taxa described in 1993